The McMillan TAC-50 is a long-range anti-materiel rifle. The TAC-50 is based on previous designs from the same company, which first appeared during the late 1980s. As of 2022 it holds the record for the longest confirmed sniper kill. McMillan makes several .50 caliber rifles, based on the same proprietary action, for military, law enforcement and civilian use. It is produced in Phoenix, Arizona, in the United States by McMillan Firearms Manufacturing.

The TAC-50 is a military and law enforcement weapon, which, designated as the C15, has been the standard long-range sniper weapon (LRSW) of the Canadian Army since 2000. Rifles of the TAC-50 family are guaranteed to provide 0.5 minute of angle (MOA) groups with match-grade ammunition under ideal conditions.

Design details
The McMillan TAC-50 is a manually operated, rotary bolt-action rifle. The large bolt has dual front locking lugs, and its body has spiral flutes to reduce weight. The heavy match-grade barrel, made by Lilja barrels, is also fluted to dissipate heat quickly and reduce overall weight, and fitted with an effective muzzle brake to reduce recoil. The rifle is fed from detachable box magazines, holding 5 rounds each. The stock is made from fiberglass by McMillan Stocks, and is designed to be used from a bipod only. The buttstock is adjustable for length of pull with rubber spacers, and can be removed for compact storage. The rifle has no open sights; it can be used with a variety of telescopic or night sights.

In Canadian service, the standard telescopic sight was the McMillan endorsed Leupold Mark 4 16x40mm LR/T M1 Riflescope optical sight that has now been replaced by the Schmidt & Bender 5-25×56 PMII telescopic sight. McMillan also endorses the Nightforce NXS 8-32x56 Mil-dot telescopic sight for the TAC-50.

Variants

TAC-50 A1
In 2012 the TAC-50 A1 variant was introduced. The TAC-50 A1 has a new take-down fiberglass stock with a forend that is  longer than the TAC-50 stock. This moves the balance point for the bipod forward. The stock includes an integral cheekpiece and a monopod on the buttstock with an option for vertical adjustment. The stock incorporates a smaller pistol grip to fit a wider range of hand shapes, with and without gloves. The magazine release lever was repositioned ahead of the trigger bow to make the system easier to operate with gloved hands. For the A1 variant a new lighter bipod with legs that adjust vertically, as well as forward and rearward, to fine-tune the rifle for elevation was also developed.

TAC-50 A1-R2
The TAC-50 A1-R2 variant was introduced in 2012 alongside the TAC-50 A1 variant. The A1-R2 variant is basically a TAC-50 A1 rifle system with a hydraulic recoil mitigation system (a proprietary hydraulic piston in the buttstock) added to reduce the considerable amount of free recoil the .50 BMG chambering generates, and hence increase user comfort.

World record

An unnamed Canadian Joint Task Force 2 sniper made the longest recorded sniper kill in history with this weapon in Iraq. He made the kill within the 30-day period leading up to 22 June 2017.

Two of the top five longest recorded sniper kills were made with the McMillan TAC-50 rifle, all by Canadian soldiers.

Users

: Canadian Army, JTF2 designated as the C15 long-range sniper weapon (LRSW).
: infantry of the FORPRONU and French Navy commandos.
: army & special operations forces.
: Used by special forces units.
: Used by SRR-61 (Special Reconnaissance Regiment).
: In service with South African Police Service Special Task Force.
: Turkish Gendarmerie and Special Forces Command
: United States Navy SEALs designated as the Mk 15.
: Ukrainian Army

See also
List of sniper rifles

References

External links

Official McMillan Firearms website
Official TAC-50 page
Data Summary McMillan Tactical TAC-50
Modern Firearms

Sniper rifles of the United States
Bolt-action rifles of the United States
.50 BMG sniper rifles
Anti-materiel rifles
Military equipment introduced in the 2000s
Sniper rifles of Canada